Abida vergniesiana is a species of air-breathing land snail, a terrestrial pulmonate gastropod mollusc in the family Chondrinidae.

Geographic distribution
The native distribution of A. vergniesiana is restricted to France, where it occurs in the upper Garonne catchment in Ariège, and Andorra.

Ecology
A. vergniesiana is a rock-dwelling species of land snail. It lives on limestone.

See also 
List of non-marine molluscs of Metropolitan France
List of non-marine molluscs of Andorra

References

Chondrinidae
Gastropods of Europe
Gastropods described in 1847